, better known as Tenkai Tsunami, is a Japanese professional boxer. She is a world champion in two weight classes, having held the WBO female junior-flyweight title from 2018 to July 2021 and previously the WBA female super-flyweight title from 2009 to 2012. She also held the challenged for the WBA female bantamweight title in 2012; the WBC female super-flyweight title in 2013; and the IBF female bantamweight title in 2015. As of September 2020, she is ranked as the world's third best active female junior-flyweight by The Ring and fifth by BoxRec.

Professional career
Tsunami made her professional debut on 12 June 2005, scoring a third-round technical knockout (TKO) victory against Maki Ochiai at the Kitazawa Town Hall in Tokyo, Japan. 

After compiling a record of 3–1 (1 KO), she challenged Ju Hee Kim for the IFBA junior-flyweight title on 22 April 2006 at Shingoo University in Seongnam, South Korea. Tsunami suffered the second defeat of her career, losing by unanimous decision (UD) over ten rounds.

After another eight fights–seven wins with three by stoppage–she defeated Eun Young Kim on 18 May 2008 at the Yangcheongu Hall in Seoul, South Korea, capturing the IFBA bantamweight title via UD with scores of 98–94, 96–94 and 97–96.

After retaining her title by majority decision (MD) against Young Kim in a rematch in August and a TKO victory against Soo-Hyun Oh in a non-title fight in November, Tsunami challenged WBA female super-flyweight champion, Zhang Xiyan, on 26 February 2009 at the Korakuen Hall in Tokyo. Tsunami won the bout by split decision (SD) to capture her first major world title. Two judges scored the bout in favour of Tsunami with 98–92 and 97–95, while the third scored it 96–95 to Zhang. After four successful defences, winning two by stoppage, she lost the title by UD against Naoko Yamaguchi on 9 July 2012 at the Korakuen Hall. Two judges scored the bout 97–93 and the third scored it 97–94.

Following defeat to Yamaguchi, she moved up in weight to challenge WBA female bantamweight champion, Janeth Perez, on 6 October 2012 at the Palenque de la Feria in Tepic, Mexico. Tsunami failed in her second attempt at a major world title, losing by UD. Two judges scored the bout 99–91 and the third scored it 100–90.

Following her fifth defeat she moved back down to super-flyweight, losing a ten-round UD to former world champion Mariana Juárez in December, before challenging WBC female super-flyweight champion, Zulina Muñoz, on 2 March 2013 at the Gimnasio de las Liebres in Río Bravo, Mexico. Tsunami failed in her third attempt at a world title, losing by UD with scores of 95–93 twice, and 97–92. 

She suffered her fifth consecutive loss five months later against Jessica Chávez in September, before breaking the losing streak with a TKO win against Leslie Domingo in November. She lost again in her next fight against Arely Muciño in January 2014 before defeating Honey Mae Bermoy on 7 March at the Korakuen Hall, capturing the vacant OPBF female bantamweight title via seventh-round TKO.

After a loss in a rematch with Jessica Chávez the following month and a TKO win against Rathsada Sor Worasin in March 2015, she challenged IBF female bantamweight champion, Carolina Rodriguez, on 22 August 2015 at the Gimnasio Sokol in Antofagasta, Chile. In what was her third attempt to gain a second major world title, Tsunami lost by UD with scores of 98–92, 99–91 and 100–91.

She won three of her four following fights, all by stoppage, before facing Chaoz Minowa for the vacant WBO female junior-flyweight title on 8 March 2018 at the Korakuen Hall. Tsunami defeated Minowa by stoppage after she failed to come out of her corner for the ninth round, awarding Tsunami the WBO title via eighth-round corner retirement (RTD). At the time of the stoppage Tsunami was ahead on all three judges scorecards, with scores of 78–74 twice and 78–75. Following a successful defence of her newly acquired title, a TKO win over Gretchen Abaniel in July, she moved up in weight to challenge WBA female flyweight champion, Naoko Fujioka, on 12 July 2019 at the Korakuen Hall. Fujioka retained her title through a split draw, with one judge scoring the bout 96–94 in favour of Tsunami, another scoring it 95–94 to Fujioka while the third scored it even at 95–95.

Professional boxing record

References

Living people
1984 births
Japanese women boxers
Sportspeople from Okinawa Prefecture
Light-flyweight boxers
Flyweight boxers
Super-flyweight boxers
Bantamweight boxers
World Boxing Association champions
World Boxing Organization champions